Aírton Graciliano dos Santos (born 15 May 1974 in Porto Alegre), commonly known as Caíco, is a former Brazilian football player.

Club statistics

Honours 
Internacional
 Campeonato Gaúcho: 1992, 1994
 Copa do Brasil: 1992

Santos
 Torneio Rio-São Paulo: 1997

Atlético Paranaense
 Campeonato Paranaense: 1998

Atlético Mineiro
 Campeonato Mineiro: 2000

Itumbiara
 Campeonato Goiano: 2008

Brazil
 Toulon Tournament: 1993
 FIFA World Youth Championship: 1993

References

External links

1974 births
Living people
Footballers from Porto Alegre
Association football midfielders
Brazilian footballers
Brazilian expatriate footballers
Expatriate footballers in Switzerland
Expatriate footballers in Portugal
Expatriate footballers in Japan
Brazilian expatriate sportspeople in Japan
Campeonato Brasileiro Série A players
Campeonato Brasileiro Série B players
J1 League players
Primeira Liga players
Sport Club Internacional players
Tokyo Verdy players
CR Flamengo footballers
Santos FC players
Club Athletico Paranaense players
Clube Atlético Mineiro players
FC Lugano players
Associação Atlética Ponte Preta players
Goiás Esporte Clube players
U.D. Leiria players
Esporte Clube Juventude players
C.S. Marítimo players
Coritiba Foot Ball Club players
Itumbiara Esporte Clube players
Vila Nova Futebol Clube players